Vincent Martin Leonard (December 11, 1908 – August 28, 1994) was an American prelate of the Catholic Church. He served as bishop of the Diocese of Pittsburgh in Pennsylvania from 1969 to 1983.

Biography

Early life 
Vincent Leonard was born on December 11, 1908, in Pittsburgh, Pennsylvania, one of nine children of Francis and Catherine (née Dolan) Leonard. His father worked in the steel mills. He was raised in the Hill District neighborhood of Pittsburgh, and received his early education at the parochial school of St. Brigid Parish. After graduating from Duquesne University Preparatory School, he studied at Duquesne University in Pittsburgh and then at St. Vincent Seminary in Latrobe.

Priesthood 
Leonard was ordained to the priesthood for the Diocese of Pittsburgh by Bishop Hugh C. Boyle on June 16, 1935. His first assignment was as assistant chaplain at Mercy Hospital in Pittsburgh, where he remained for two years. From 1937 to 1950, he was resident chaplain of Allegheny County Home and Woodville State Hospital. He was later named assistant chancellor (1950), chancellor (1951), and vicar general (1959) of the diocese. In addition to these duties, Boyle served as pastor of St. Patrick Parish in the Strip District (1955–1967) and of St. Philip Parish in Crafton, Pennsylvania (1967–1969). He was named a domestic prelate by Pope Pius XII in 1952.

Auxiliary Bishop and Bishop of Pittsburgh 
On February 28, 1964, Leonard was appointed as an auxiliary bishop of the Diocese of Pittsburgh and Titular Bishop of Arsacal by Pope Paul VI. He received his episcopal consecration on April 21, 1964, from Bishop John Wright, with Bishops Richard Henry Ackerman and William G. Connare serving as co-consecrators. He selected as his episcopal motto: Ut Christum Lucrifaciam ("That I may gain Christ").

After Bishop Wright was named to head the Congregation for the Clergy, Leonard was appointed the ninth bishop of Pittsburgh on June 1, 1969. During his tenure, he became one of the first bishops in the United States to make his diocesan financial reports public, and established a due-process system to allow Catholics to appeal any administrative decision they believed was a violation of canon law. In 1974, he threatened three priests with disciplinary action for giving Communion in the hand when it was not yet permitted in the United States. He also served on the Pro-Life Committee of the National Conference of Catholic Bishops and on the Health Affairs Committee of the United States Catholic Conference.

Retirement and legacy 
Pope Paul II accepted Leonard's resignation as Bishop of Pittsburgh on June 30, 1983, due to arthritis. Vincent Leonard died on August 28, 1994, from pneumonia at the Little Sisters of the Poor Home in Pittsburgh, at age 85. He is buried in Calvary Cemetery in the Hazelwood neighborhood of Pittsburgh.

References

External links
Roman Catholic Diocese of Pittsburgh History of Bishops webpage

1908 births
1994 deaths
American Roman Catholic clergy of Irish descent
Burials at Calvary Catholic Cemetery (Pittsburgh)
Religious leaders from Pittsburgh
Roman Catholic bishops of Pittsburgh
Duquesne University alumni
20th-century Roman Catholic bishops in the United States
Participants in the Second Vatican Council